King's Quest III: To Heir Is Human is the third installment in the King's Quest series of graphic adventure games developed and released by Sierra On-Line in 1986. The game was originally released for the Apple II and PC DOS, and later ported to several other computer systems. It was the first title game in the series not to feature King Graham as the player character.

Gameplay 

Most of the game's various lands and locations appear in the magic map. Once the protagonist Gwydion reaches a new region, he can use the magic map to travel to a previous region.

A real-time clock is displayed at the top of the screen, with certain actions occurring based on the clock.

King's Quest III was markedly more difficult than its two predecessors. The player was required to type in magic spells line-by-line from a spell book that came with the game. The spells partially served as a form of copy protection, although the game already had disk-based protection.

Gwydion's movements are controlled by the player using cursor buttons. In the original release version 1.01 (1986-11-08), using the AGI engine, the escape button pauses the game and there are no menus. Commands are accessed through the F keys, "Ctrl-", or manually typing; F1 displays a Help file listing all the commands. It has disk-based copy protection. The version 2.14 (1988-3-15) was included in many of the King's Quest collections over the years, with the disk based self-booting copy-protection removed. Pushing escape brings up a menu (arrow keys can be used to choose options), and the speed controls are included in the menu.

Plot

Story 
In King's Quest III, the story moves away from Daventry and King Graham to the land of Llewdor, where a boy named Gwydion is being kept by the wicked wizard Manannan. According to the introduction, for as long as he could remember, 17-year-old Gwydion has been held captive by Manannan as his servant, cooking and cleaning for him in his home atop a large mountain in Llewdor. From this vantage point, and with the help of a telescope, the seemingly all-knowing wizard watches the countryside, the shoreline and vast ocean to the east and an endless desert to the west.

Manannan takes a series of absences and Gwydion seizes his chance to escape. He breaks into the wizard's laboratory and reads Manannan's book of spells, then goes out into Llewdor to collect ingredients for them. After solving many puzzles to obtain the spell ingredients, Gwydion turns Manannan into a cat and is free. He also learns from an oracle that he is in fact the long-lost prince of Daventry, Prince Alexander, and that his sister Princess Rosella is going to be sacrificed to a horrible three-headed dragon that has been besieging the kingdom.

After defeating Manannan, Alexander attempts to buy passage on a ship, but is instead captured by pirates. After sailing to the coast of Daventry, he manages to use another spell to put the pirates to sleep and escape, stealing their treasure in the process. Alexander traverses a series of mountains before finally reaching the outskirts of Daventry where he discovers Rosella about to be slain by the dragon. Using one of Manannan's spells, Alexander creates a thunderstorm and kills the dragon with lightning strikes. Alexander rescues his sister and the two return to Daventry where they are joyously reunited with the king and queen. The Magic Mirror, which has been clouded by a mystical darkness since the night Prince Alexander was kidnapped, is restored and King Graham decides to pass on his adventurer's cap to his children. As the game ends, King Graham tosses the cap to Alexander and Rosella who reach out to catch it.

The game's title is a pun on the proverb "To err is human, to forgive divine" by Alexander Pope, whose namesake may have been given to the character Gwydion once it is later revealed who he really is in the game. The actions taken by Gwydion in this story lead directly to the events that begin King's Quest IV.

Characters 
 Gwydion: Gwydion was a young lad kidnapped from his cradle not long after his birth by the evil wizard Manannan. The wizard had teleported into his homeland, cast a sleep spell on his family, and brought him to Llewdor as a slave. As he was kidnapped when he was very young, he does not remember his family. As is the tradition, Gwydion was to be killed on his eighteenth birthday; he learns this fact and decides to find a way to escape before that day comes. Using forbidden spells Gwydion learns how to understand animals and meets the Oracle, from whom he learns his true identity as Prince Alexander of Daventry. He learns he must save his sister from a three-headed dragon that is terrorizing Daventry, or lose his family forever. Gwydion finally escapes the evil wizard, crosses the ocean, defeats the dragon, and reunites with his family. Upon his return the magic mirror, which went dark upon his kidnapping, is restored.
 Manannan: An old, evil wizard who had the custom of kidnapping infant boys and training them as his servants only to kill them at age eighteen. He is member of the Magicians' Guild. For many years he reigned as the absolute ruler of the land of Llewdor, and under his leadership brigands, thieves and the like prospered. Manannan made a fatal error, however, in the choosing of his final servant, a baby boy whom he named Gwydion (who later was found to actually be Alexander, Prince of Daventry and current king of the Land of the Green Isles). Gwydion was able to escape the clutches of Manannan and, learning several magic spells, turned Manannan into a cat. He had kidnapped the boy in revenge for Graham's rescue of Valanice from his sister Hagatha (King's Quest II). King Graham later encountered Manannan in Mordack's castle and captured him in a sack of peas. After the defeat of his brother Mordack at the hands of King Graham of Daventry, Manannan was never seen or heard from again and his fate remains unknown. Manannan's name is based on a wizard of Welsh myth, Manannan Mac Lir.
 Rosella: She is the princess of Daventry, and Alexander's sister. She was about to be sacrificed to the three headed dragon, when Alexander arrived, killed the dragon, and freed her. She is the main character of the next game.
 Graham: He is the king of Daventry. Following Alexander's kidnapping, Daventry endured terrible hardship in the form of many devastating earthquakes that destroyed many landmarks. Soon after, a vile three-headed dragon laid waste to the kingdom and began to demand the sacrifice of maidens for its bounty. For some years the dragon ravaged the land. Graham's previously good judgment and wisdom had not recovered from the shock of Alexander's kidnapping. Choosing what he felt was best for Daventry, in an attempt to protect the land, he started sending innocent girls off to be sacrificed to the fire-breathing dragon, even consenting to the sacrifice of his only daughter, Rosella. The princess later forgave him for taking her to the dragon, but his memory of tying her to the stake still sometimes disturbs his dreams. That she was rescued and survived only eases the horror a little.
 Valanice: She is the queen of Daventry. The kidnapping of her baby son Alexander from his cradle was a massive blow to her, not just because of the loss, but because it reopened memories of her own kidnapping. Valanice attempted to submerge her grief through hard work—first by studying the histories of the world, and then by opening a school to teach the brightest children of the kingdom. She spent much time teaching Rosella how to read and the histories of the world. When the three-headed dragon demanded the sacrifice of a young maiden, she fiercely fought against the decision to comply, and when it came time to offer her daughter to the beast she refused, standing guard by Rosella's room with a drawn sword. But it was not enough, and she was forced to watch as her child was taken up the mountain.

Development and release 
King's Quest III was the biggest and most ambitious game Sierra had made up to that point. The series' designer and writer Roberta Williams said: "My previous games, from Mystery House to King's Quest II, were all great. But they were essentially glorified treasure hunts... your object being to win the game by finding and collecting items. It was not possible to have bigger and more complex plots than that thanks to technical limitations". By the mid-1980s, the new generation computer platforms such as the IBM AT, Amiga, and Macintosh were faster and sported more memory as well as standard hard disks. Thus, it was now possible to develop games of greater complexity than had been possible on 8-bit machines.

Roberta Williams collaborated with a team consisting mainly of the same people that worked with her on the previous two games, but more people were involved in the production this time. Al Lowe, who made the music in King's Quest II, became the lead programmer of King's Quest III, while his wife Margaret made the music instead. This was the game on which Al Lowe cut his teeth before moving onto his own series, Leisure Suit Larry. Williams said: "Rosella was introduced toward the end of the game; seeing her on the screen for the first time, I suddenly saw her on her own adventures in a sequel".

King's Quest III was the first adventure game featuring auto-mapping, with a "magic map" found in the game that can be used to teleport to most locations that the player has visited before. This feature was unpopular among some fans who claim it made the game too easy. Hence, magic maps in future Sierra On-line games were more limited in their teleporting ability. The developers also introduced a real-time clock, with actions based on the clock. The game was released on five 5.25" floppy disks and three 3.5" disks, as Sierra's second largest game after Time Zone (six disks). It was almost 50% larger than King's Quest I or King's Quest II. KQ3 had 104 screens, whereas the first KQ had about 80 and KQII had about 92.

King's Quest III was the first Sierra game to be DOS-based instead of using a self-booting disk, as well as the first to feature EGA and Hercules graphics support. A year later, it was rereleased with the slightly improved AGI 2.435  engine, followed by another release with the 2.936  engine in 1988. The Apple IIGS version had improved music and sound effects.

The game's manual contains a short prologue story by Annette Childs that tells of Manannan's previous slaves and their deaths. The book also contains spells from The Sorcery of Old, needed to cast the spells in the game (these are reprinted in The King's Quest Companion).

King's Quest III was the first game in which Sierra used a manual-based copy protection scheme (although technically not intended to be copy protection). Nearly all AGI games (including King's Quest III) have a disk-based copy protection, requiring the original game disk to be present in order to play the game. This was not entirely effective and unofficial versions were widespread (this key-disk check was removed from the later-released "King's Quest Collection" versions). However, to complete King's Quest III, the player needs to create a number of magic spells through alchemical formulas that are only available in the game's manual. Many considered the process slightly overdone; 140 of the 210 possible points in the game are obtained through simply doing what the manual says, leaving less room for real puzzles. Starting with King's Quest IV, later Sierra games would instead ask for but a few actions described in the manual. Most often it was a dialog window appearing once, requesting the player to enter word X from page Y of the manual. This was not a true form of copy protection and was actually considered a game feature (as most puzzles in the game are based on the spells), and thus the complete spell list was reprinted in many of the official guides at the time, including the Official Book of King's Quest: Daventry and Beyond and The King's Quest Companion.

A novelization of the game is included in The King's Quest Companion. The novelization is written in the form of an interview between Derek Karlavaegen ("Guidebook to the Land of the Green Isles") and Alexander sometime after the events of the third game. This was written to be a novel-style walkthrough used to solve the game. The "Encyclopedia of Daventry" in the first and second edition offered a few more backstories and details about the various characters and objects from the game. The chapter "The World of Daventry" also included more details about the Land of Llewdor, and its inhabitants. The book also contains copies of the spells from The Sorcerery of Old, needed to beat the game.

Reception 
King's Quest III sold 250,000 copies by February 1993. According to Sierra On-Line, combined sales of the King's Quest series surpassed 3.8 million units by the end of March 1996.

Though for the most part well received, winning the Softsel Hot List Hottest Product Award in 1987, the release of this product in 1986 was quickly met with loud protests from gamers claiming that King's Quest III was not really a King's Quest. Because it focused on a young slave named Gwydion and his attempts to escape his evil master, players did not grasp the connection between Gwydion and King Graham of Daventry until they finished the game some months later.

A review in Computer Gaming World described the game as exceedingly frustrating, from the task of climbing stairs to identifying objects from their low-resolution graphics. The hint guide was highly recommended as a way to alleviate some of that frustration. The reviewer suggested gamers new to the series play King's Quest I instead, it being much easier.

The "automatic mapping feature" was widely promoted with King's Quest III, but it was not included in later King's Quest games as player feedback indicated it reduced challenge. According to Roberta Williams, "KQ3 was very dark, and it utilized lots of magic and magic spells with the basic idea of finding ingredients for 'black magic' spells and then casting those spells. Certain religious groups were upset with me over that one!"

In August 2016, King's Quest III placed 50th on Time's The 50 Best Video Games of All Time list.

Fan remakes 
There have been two unofficial fan remakes. Infamous Adventures created a remake, King's Quest III: To Heir Is Human in 2006. It is a slightly expanded remake offering new material, including new cutscenes, a few new characters, expanded narration or dialogue, full speech, new or modified locations, and easter eggs. Most of the original puzzles remain intact, although the spell system was streamlined. The game was made by the team because they wanted to see if they could do it, and prove they had the drive and ability to recreate the game with updated graphics and sounds. AGD Interactive released another remake, King's Quest III Redux, in 2011.

Notes

References 

Bibliography

External links 
 
 King's Quest III technical help at the Sierra Help Pages

1980s interactive fiction
1986 video games
Adventure games
Point-and-click adventure games
Amiga games
Apple IIGS games
Atari ST games
DOS games
King's Quest
Sierra Entertainment games
ScummVM-supported games
TRS-80 Color Computer games
Video game sequels
Video games developed in the United States